Gaspare (also Gaspero, Gasperino and Gasparro) is an Italian male given name, the literal translation of the English name Casper and Jasper (French Gaspard, Scandinavian Kasper and Jesper).

The name is rare in contemporary times, but was common enough in the past such that it is the root of a number of Italian surnames, such as De Gasperi, Gasperini, Gasparini, and Gasparri.

It may refer to:

Given name 
Gasparo Angiolini
Gaspare Ambrosini
Gasparo Berti
Gaspare Colosimo 
Gasparo Contarini
Gaspare Finali (1829–1949), Italian academic and politician
Gasparo Gozzi
Gaspare DiGregorio
Gaspare "Gap" Mangione
Gaspare Messina
Gaspare Pacchierotti
Gasparo da Salò
Gaspare Spontini
Gasparo Tagliacozzi

Surname 
Oronzo Vito Gasparo

Italian masculine given names